Linda M. Marsh is a retired United States Air Force major general who last served as the Deputy Director of Logistics Operations of the Joint Staff. Previously, she was the Mobilization Assistant to the Commander of the Air Force Materiel Command.

References

Living people
Place of birth missing (living people)
United States Air Force generals
Year of birth missing (living people)